= Convento de Nuestra Señora del Carmen (Zaragoza) =

Monastery in Aragon, Spain

Convento de Nuestra Señora del Carmen was a monastery in Zaragoza municipality, Aragon, Spain. It was established in 1290 and demolished in 1835.
